LSA High School is a community school maintained by Lancashire County Education Authority. It is an 11–16 Comprehensive.

History 

 1955 Ansdell County Secondary School Opens.
 1999 School gains Technology College status and becomes known as Lytham St. Annes High Technology College.
 2004 School awarded prestigious Artsmark Silver Award.
 2007 School also gains Performing Arts status and becomes known as LSA Technology and Performing Arts College.
 2010 Outstanding School status awarded by OFSTED
 2020 Name changed to LSA High School

Notable former pupils

Sports 
 Kieran Brookes – Rugby union player who plays for Northampton Saints and England.
 John Hills – footballer/coach (Blackpool, Everton)
 Scott McNiven – Footballer Oldham Athletic A.F.C, Oxford United F.C., Mansfield Town F.C., Chester City F.C., Hyde United F.C.
 David McNiven (footballer, born 1978) – Footballer Oldham Athletic A.F.C, York City F.C., Hamilton Academical F.C., Queen of the South F.C., Hyde United F.C., twin brother of Scott McNiven
 Jamie Milligan – Footballer Everton F.C., Blackpool F.C., Coach at the Blackpool F.C. Centre of Excellence.

Music and acting 
 Dean Lennox Kelly – actor; best known for his role in Shameless
 Craig Kelly – Actor; best known for his roles as Vince Tyler in the Channel 4 television series Queer as Folk (UK TV series) and as Luke Strong in Coronation Street. Trick or Treat (2020) that also starred his brother Dean Lennox Kelly
 Joni Fuller – Singer-songwriter; awarded 'Best Female Artist' at the Exposure Music Awards 2010 and later featured as 'one to watch' by PRS for Music
 Danny Howard – Radio 1 DJ
 Craig Parkinson – Actor. Misfits (TV series), Line of Duty, Prey

Other 
 Sam Shearon – graphics artist, specialising in horror and science-fiction.

References

External links 
 Official website

Schools in the Borough of Fylde
Lytham St Annes
Secondary schools in Lancashire
Foundation schools in Lancashire